Brian Hill (born 15 December 1942) is a former professional footballer born in Mansfield, who played as a winger for Grimsby Town, Huddersfield Town, Blackburn Rovers and Torquay United in the Football League, and in non-league football for Boston United.

References

External links
 League stats at Neil Brown's site

1942 births
Living people
Footballers from Mansfield
English footballers
Association football wingers
Ollerton Colliery F.C. players
Grimsby Town F.C. players
Huddersfield Town A.F.C. players
Blackburn Rovers F.C. players
Torquay United F.C. players
Boston United F.C. players
English Football League players